InterContinental Dublin formerly the Four Seasons Hotel Dublin is a Five Star luxury hotel located in Ballsbridge, on the south side of Dublin. Formerly part of the Toronto based Four Seasons chain of luxury hotels and resorts. The InterContinental Dublin was rebranded on 1 January 2015. Built in 2001, the hotel has at various times been included in Travel and Leisure's Top 500 hotels since its opening.

In 2011 the hotel was sold out of Receivership by Anglo Irish Bank to the Livingstone Brother's London & Regional Properties for an estimated €15m.

In 2019 the hotel was acquired by a John C. Malone backed vehicle for an estimated €50m.

The hotel also houses serviced apartments at the penthouse level.

References 

Hotels in Dublin (city)
InterContinental hotels
Hotels established in 2001
Hotel buildings completed in 2001
21st-century architecture in the Republic of Ireland